Liberty Township is one of thirteen townships in Parke County, Indiana, United States. As of the 2010 census, its population was 739 and it contained 324 housing units.

History
The W.H. York Round Barn, Bowsher Ford Covered Bridge, Marshall Covered Bridge, Mill Creek Covered Bridge, and Rush Creek Covered Bridge are listed on the National Register of Historic Places.

Geography

Unincorporated towns
 Howard at 
 Lodi at 
 Sylvania at 
 Tangier at 
(This list is based on USGS data and may include former settlements.)

Cemeteries
The township contains these seven cemeteries: Brockway, Ephlin, Harvey, Miller, Rush Creek, Russell and Shirk.

School districts
 Turkey Run Community School Corporation

Political districts
 State House District 42
 State Senate District 38

References
 
 United States Census Bureau 2009 TIGER/Line Shapefiles
 IndianaMap

External links
 Indiana Township Association
 United Township Association of Indiana
 City-Data.com page for Liberty Township

Townships in Parke County, Indiana
Townships in Indiana